Dmitri Radchuk (born 26 May 1990) is a Russian ice hockey player. He is currently playing with Torpedo Nizhny Novgorod of the Kontinental Hockey League (KHL).

Radchuk made his Kontinental Hockey League (KHL) debut playing with Torpedo Nizhny Novgorod during the 2009–10 KHL season.

References

External links

1990 births
Living people
Torpedo Nizhny Novgorod players
Russian ice hockey right wingers
Sportspeople from Nizhny Novgorod